Shimia marina is a bacterium from the genus of Shimia which has been isolated from biofilm from a coastal fish farm from Tongyeong in Korea.

References 

Rhodobacteraceae
Bacteria described in 2006